A referendum on resolving the border dispute with Croatia was held in Slovenia on 6 June 2010. Voters were asked whether the dispute should be brought before an international arbitration tribunal. The results showed 51.54% of voters in favour, with a voter turnout of 42.66%.

Background
The referendum was officially requested in parliament on 26 April 2010, with the date for the election to be decided within seven days, i.e. by 3 May 2010. The election was called in the evening on 3 May 2010 for 6 June 2010 as had been expected.

The official wording was:

Polling
Before the referendum, polls constantly showed a majority of the population in favour of the agreement:
November 2009: 49% to 37% in favour
January 2010: 64% to 28% in favour
March 2010: 50% to 30% in favour
Early May 2010: 37.6% to 32.9% in favour
Late May 2010: 50.7% to 36.1% in favour
Late May 2010: 37.6% to 37.0% against
Early June 2010: 54% to 46% in favour
Early June 2010: 56.8% to 43.2% in favour

Results

See also
Croatia–Slovenia border disputes
Croatia–Slovenia relations

References

2010 referendums
Border dispute agreement referendum
Border dispute agreement referendum
Border
June 2010 events in Europe